Sewell Branch is a  long 3rd order tributary to Andover Branch in Kent and Queen Annes Counties, Maryland.  In Maryland, Sewell Branch forms the boundary in part of Kent and Queen Annes Counties.

Variant names
According to the Geographic Names Information System, it has also been known historically as:  
Mill Branch
Sewells Branch
Wiccomis Branch
Wickomis Branch

Course
Sewell Branch rises on the Pinks Branch divide at Underwood Corner, Delaware. Sewell Branch then flows westerly into Maryland to meet Andover Branch about 1 mile southeast of Peacock Corners, Maryland.

Watershed
Sewell Branch drains  of area, receives about 44.7 in/year of precipitation, has a topographic wetness index of 673.20 and is about 6.8% forested.

See also
List of rivers of Delaware

Additional Images

References 

Rivers of Delaware
Rivers of Kent County, Delaware
Rivers of Maryland
Rivers of Kent County, Maryland
Rivers of Queen Anne's County, Maryland